Izteraab is a 2014 Pakistani television series that aired on Hum TV, and was written by Amna Mufti and directed by Misbah Khalid. It is produced by M&M Productions. It stars Saba Qamar and Mekaal Zulfiqar on their second on-screen collaboration after Pani Jaisa Piyar in 2011.

Plot 
Izteraab is the tale of a man having two wives. It explores the story of Jazib. He falls in love with Zara and they marry. Jazib is conservative by nature whereas Zara is liberal minded, which causes disagreements between them resulting in separation. Jazib then marries Dua. The story takes a new turn when he learns that Zara has cancer. Later Jazib and Zara reunite. It is implied that Dua leaves to do some social work so Jazib and Zara and their children can work to become a family again.

Cast 
Saba Qamar as Zara
Mikaal Zulfiqar as Jazib
Saniya Shamshad as Dua
Seemi Raheel as Rashida: Jazib's aunt
Mehreen Khurram as Sofia

References

External links 
 Hum TV official website

2014 Pakistani television series debuts
Pakistani drama television series
Urdu-language television shows
Hum TV original programming
Hum TV